is an essay on Japanese aesthetics by the Japanese author and novelist Jun'ichirō Tanizaki. It was translated into English by the academic students of Japanese literature Thomas Harper and Edward Seidensticker. A new translation by Gregory Starr was published in December 2017.

Publication
Already sketched out in a series of comments that appear in Some Prefer Nettles, Tanizaki's aesthetic credo, in the more finished form of this essay, was originally published in 1933 in Japanese. The English translation was published in 1977 by Leete's Island Books.

The translation contains a foreword by architect and educator Charles Moore and an afterword by one of the translators, Thomas J. Harper. Harper was Senior Lecturer in Japanese Literature at the Australian National University in Canberra. The other translator, Edward Seidensticker, was Professor of Japanese Literature at Columbia University.

Much shorter than the author's novels, this book is a small meditative work of 73 pages, of which 59 are the essay itself.

A new English translation by Gregory Starr, with illustrations and photographs by Andrew Pothecary, was published by Sora Books in December 2017. The 102-page edition also includes a foreword by the Japanese architect Kengo Kuma and an afterword by Japanese literature Professor Eve Zimmerman of Wellesley College.

Themes
The essay consists of 16 sections that discuss traditional Japanese aesthetics in contrast with change. Comparisons of light with darkness are used to contrast Western and Asian cultures. The West, in its striving for progress, is presented as continuously searching for light and clarity, while the subtle and subdued forms of East Asian art and literature are seen by Tanizaki to represent an appreciation of shadow and subtlety, closely relating to the traditional Japanese concept of sabi. In addition to contrasting light and dark, Tanizaki further considers the layered tones of various kinds of shadows and their power to reflect low sheen materials like gold embroidery, patina and cloudy crystals. In addition, he distinguishes between the values of gleam and shine.

The text presents personal reflections on topics as diverse as architecture and its fittings, crafts, finishes, jade, food, cosmetics and mono no aware (the art of impermanence). Tanizaki explores in close description the use of space in buildings, lacquerware by candlelight, monastery toilets and women in the dark of a brothel. The essay acts as "a classic description of the collision between the shadows of traditional Japanese interiors and the dazzling light of the modern age".

In the Sora Books edition, the 16 section themes are:
 On construction
 The toilet aesthetic
 A different course
 A novelist's daydreams
 On paper, tin and dirt
 Candlelight and lacquerware
 Bowls of broth
 The enigma of shadows
 An uncanny silence
 Reflections in darkness
 Shadows on the stage
 The woman of old
 Beauty in the dark
 A world of shadows
 A cool breeze in total darkness
 Final grumblings

Cultural notes
Tanizaki's observations include cultural notes on topics such as arts and crafts, paper making, lacquerware design and the Japanese room. He gives a recipe for the unusual dish of Persimmon leaf Sushi on pages 60 to 62. He also refers to many historic places and temples, as well as celebrated eateries of the day, along with customs like "moon-viewing" (tsukimi).

Featured individuals
Among the historic and contemporary individuals mentioned in the essay are:
 Natsume Sōseki, novelist, on the experience of textures and landscape via the traditional Japanese toilet, p. 9; Sōseki's Pillow of Grass, p. 26.
 Saitō Ryokuu, poet quoted as saying "elegance is frigid", p. 10.
 Buddha and Confucius, p. 16.
 Kongō Iwao, Nō actor, p. 39.
 Baikō, aging Kabuki actor, p. 43.
 Takebaya Sanehiko, president of Kaizō Publishing House (which had published Tanizaki's earlier novel Quicksand), p. 54.
 Albert Einstein, scientist, p. 54.

Reception
The work has been praised for its insight and relevance into issues of modernity and culture, and Tanizaki has been called an "ecological prophet".  A. C. Grayling has described Tanizaki's essay on Japanese taste as a "hymn to nuance" and an exercise in mindfulness.

Junichiro Tanizaki selects for praise all things delicate and nuanced, everything softened by shadows and the patina of age, anything understated and natural—as for example the patterns of grain in old wood, the sound of rain dripping from eaves and leaves, or washing over the footing of a stone lantern in a garden, and refreshing the moss that grows about it – and by doing so he suggests an attitude of appreciation and mindfulness, especially mindfulness of beauty, as central to life lived well.

In the spirit of Tanizaki juxtaposing the cultures of east and west, Grayling notes a link to a similar approach and emphasis in the British writer Walter Pater whose late Renaissance essay he quotes, "The service of speculative culture towards the human spirit is to rouse, to startle it to a life of constant and eager observation". Grayling concludes that the difference between the two essayists lies in the "tranquility" of Tanizaki and the "intensity" of Pater.

In 2001, Random House published a reprint in paperback.

Regarding the new translation published by Sora Books, David Mitchell, author of Cloud Atlas, wrote, "A rhapsodic meditation on a vanishing world, its aesthetics and its values. Gregory Starr's new translation is pitch perfect and transparent." Stephen Mansfield, in the Japan Times wrote, "Tanizaki, in Gregory Starr’s new and highly accomplished translation, samples a number of instances where the use and perception of light differs from the West, noting that, where Western paper reflects light, traditional Japanese paper absorbs it."

The book also served as the primary inspiration for an album of the same name by musician Puma Blue.

References

1933 books
Books by Junichiro Tanizaki